A list of drivers who have been selected to compete at the 2015 IFMAR 1:10 Electric Off-Road World Championship via invitation by their respective national sanctioning bodies.

Member blocs are sorted in IFMAR's rotational order starting with host bloc then the host bloc following that.

Far East Model Car Association (FEMCA)

Drivers total:

Australia

Hong Kong

South Korea

Japan

Malaysia

Singapore

Taiwan

European Federation of Radio Operated Model Automobiles (EFRA)

Drivers total:

Austria

Czech Republic

Denmark

Finland

France

Germany

Great Britain

Ireland

Monaco

Norway

Poland

Portugal

Slovakia

Spain

Sweden

Switzerland

Remotely Operated Auto Racers (ROAR)

Drivers total:

United States

Canada

References

Notes

Bibliography

IFMAR 1:10 Electric Off-Road World Championship